Língyáng may refer to the following locations in China:

 Lingyang, Qingyang County, town in southern Anhui
 Lingyang, Linzhou, town in Linzhou, Henan
 Lingyang, Ju County, town in Ju County, Shandong

 Lingyang, Cili (零阳镇), a town of Cili County, Hunan Province.